Juwon Oshaniwa (born 14 September 1990) is a Nigerian international footballer who plays for Akwa United as a left back. He has previously played for Kwara United, Lobi Stars, Sharks in Nigeria, Ashdod in Israel and Heart of Midlothian in Scotland. Oshaniwa is a full international for Nigeria and played in the 2014 FIFA World Cup.

Club career

Ashdod
Oshaniwa played club football in Nigeria for Kwara United, Lobi Stars and Sharks. After five years at Nigeria, Oshaniwa announced his intention to play in Europe.

In September 2012 he signed a four-year deal with Israeli club F.C. Ashdod. Oshaniwa made his Ashdod debut on 13 September 2012, where he made his first start, in a 2–1 win over Beitar Jerusalem. Just four months after signing for the club, Oshaniwa was linked with a move to Scottish Premiership side Celtic. Unfortunately, Oshaniwa suffered a virus that kept him out for months and made his return to the first team on 3 March 2013, in a 1–1 draw against Hapoel Tel Aviv. In his first season at Ashdod, Oshawniwa made sixteen appearances for the club.

His second season at Ashdod saw him continued to be in the first team regular, as he made twenty-four appearances. His playing time was restricted to six games after injuries However, the club were later relegated from the Israeli top flight after finishing last of the Bottom Playoff. In January 2015 he was linked with a transfer to Scottish Premiership side Celtic for the second time. But the move had never materialised. The 2014–15 season saw Oshaniwa had his playing time restricted following his first team opportunities being limited with eleven appearances. During the season, Oshaniwa scored his first Ashdod goal on 17 January 2015, in a 2–1 win over Hapoel Petah Tikva.

Following the 2014–15 season, it was announced that Oshaniwa left the club to make his move to Scotland.

Heart of Midlothian

In June, Oshaniwa was linked with a move to Scottish club Heart of Midlothian ("Hearts") and stated he keen to move to United Kingdom to continue his football development. Weeks later, Hearts made a move for Oshaniwa and was on verge of signing him. However, the negotiations to complete the move was delayed over visa requirement, which he eventually was granted on 28 July 2015. His move to Hearts was completed, subject to international clearance, on 1 August. Oshaniwa expressed delight to join the club.

Following the move, Oshaniwa was not playing in the opening game of the season against St Johnstone and was at the dugout watching, as he was amazed with the football, the entertainment and the fans. Oshaniwa made his Hearts debut on 8 August 2015, playing as a left-back, in a 2–1 win against Dundee. In the 2016–17 season, Oshaniwa did not make any first-team appearances. He was released by Hearts in June 2017, a year before his contract had been due to expire.

In 2018 he signed for Akwa United.

International career
Oshawniwa was called up by Nigeria on 30 March 2012 and made his international debut for Nigeria in 2012, Since being called up by the national team, Oshawina has appeared in FIFA World Cup qualifying matches.

He was called up to Nigeria's 23-man squad for the 2013 Africa Cup of Nations. After appearing as an un-used substitute in Nigeria's African Cup of Nations, Oshaniwa played in the final, where he came on as a substitute for Elderson Echiéjilé in the 66th minute, in a 1–0 win over Burkina Faso to win African Cup of Nations for the third time. He said that winning the tournament was the highlight of his career.

The following year, Oshaniwa was named in the provisional squad for the 2014 FIFA World Cup. Oshaniwa continued to be in the squad for the World Cup following the cuts to the 23-man squad, where he played in all four of Nigeria's matches at the World Cup.

Playing style
The Cable has described Oshaniwa's playing style as "strength, tough tackles, good marking in one-on-one situation."

References

1990 births
Living people
Nigerian footballers
Nigerian expatriate footballers
Nigeria international footballers
F.C. Ashdod players
Expatriate footballers in Israel
Lobi Stars F.C. players
Sharks F.C. players
Akwa United F.C. players
2013 Africa Cup of Nations players
2014 FIFA World Cup players
Israeli Premier League players
Africa Cup of Nations-winning players
People from Ilorin
Association football fullbacks
Heart of Midlothian F.C. players
Expatriate footballers in Scotland
Scottish Professional Football League players
Nigerian expatriate sportspeople in Israel
Nigerian expatriate sportspeople in Scotland